Sri Subramanya Shastrigal, also known as Sri Subramanya Yatheendraal, is the 7th Guru Parampara of Sri Abhirama Bhattar, the great sage who lived in the 17th century A.D. Shastrigal, a great Sanskrit scholar in his own right, was a student of the great Sanskrit scholar Mannargudi Raju Sastri and later was a key member of the team of scholars who trained the Mahaperiyavaa of Kanchi. He has also authored several books in Sanskrit.

Subramanya Shastrigal taught Vedas, Upanishads and Hindu scriptures and philosophy to a good number of disciples - some notable names being Srirangam Andavan Swamigal, Somadeva Sarma, Karungulam Sastrigal, Vembu Iyer and others. He was recognized as a major Sanskrit scholar of his time. He was sent by Mahaperiyavaa of Kanchi to attend the Vidwad Sadas in Kashi and received great acclaim at the Sadas. He was also instrumental in constructing the Perumal Temple in Siddhamalli in 1920. He also served as a trustee in various temple boards in Kovilur, Perugavalandan, Pamani etc., Finally, his desire to get the Apathsanyasam Yogam was Blessed by Maha Periavaa. Sastrigal attained Jeevanmukti by Mahaperiavaa. Shastrigal attained Jivanmukta at Sithamalli village in 1933 and came to be called Subramanya Yatheendral.

Life and work 

Sithamalli Subramanya Shastrigal, was born in April 1866 in Sithamalli. His father, Sri Kothandarama Iyer, was a big land owner and owned considerable land in Tanjore district. It is believed that their ancestors came from Kerala sometime in the 16th century. Sri Subramanya Shastrigal's Guruparampara is from Sri Abhirama Bhattar. Shastrigal lost his father at the very early age of 10. Shastrigal started his vedic education under Brammashri Mannargudi Raju Sastri. Raju Shastri was considered an authority on the Vedas and a pre-eminent scholar and was also the recipient of the title of Mahamahopadya from the then British Government.

Sri Subramanya Shastrigal also became an ardent devotee of Kanchi Mahaperiavaa, Sri Chandrashekarendra Saraswati and was one of the several scholars who trained Mahaperiavaa in the Vedas, Upanishads and Vyakaranam (grammar) starting in the year 1911 at Mahendramangalam. He was closely associated with Kanchi Kamakoti Mutt for most of his life and was for several years closely involved in the administration of the Mutt. He stayed with the Maha Periavaa for almost a year. The Mahaswami deputed Sri Subramanya Shastrigal to travel to Benares (Kashi) to attend the Vidwad Sadas organised by the Kashi Maharaja. Shastrigal went to Kashi and participated in the Sadas and received great acclaim for his brilliance and knowledge of Sanskrit and the scriptures. He was awarded medals, gold coins and warmly felicitated by the King of Kashi. A grand reception was accorded on behalf of the Kanchi Mutt at Madras Central upon his return. Shastrigal put all the awards at the feet of Mahaperiavaa and got his blessings.

Shastrigal's scholarship was so great and had such breadth that it is little surprise that Shri Maha Periavaa used to call him as "Library"or "Encyclopedia of Knowledge". He is also believed to have possessed photographic memory and was called "Eka Chanda Grahi Sannath" (Eka Chanda Grahi is the ability to commit to memory what one reads or hears only once).

The title "Panditaraja" was given to great scholars by the Maharaja of Cochin. Shri Subramanya Shastrigal was a proud recipient of this title.

Books authored by Shastrigal include:
Sri Chandrasekara Ashtakam
Sri Kulasekaraswami Stotram
Sri Sankarar Sthuthi
Kaladi Shankara Vijayam

Apathsanyasa Yoga 

Sri Subramanya Shastrigal, in the year 1932, was staying at his daughter Janaki's house at Thanjavur. During that time, Mahaperiavaa was also camping in Thanjavur near Sri Bangaru Kamakshi Temple. It is said that Mahaperiavaa used to visit Sri Subramanya Shastrigal daily in the morning since Shastrigal was ill. One such day, Sri Subramanya Shastrigal was lying on his bed, when Maha Periavaa came to visit. He was with the Sastrigal for more than an hour. Then Sastrigal prayed to Maha Periavaa to give Him "Apathsanyasa Yoga" since Sastrigal no longer wanted to live in the world with bodily diseases and becoming a burden to his children. Immediately upon hearing this, Maha Periavaa is said to have embraced Shastrigal and said "I give you apathsanyasa yoga...please go to Sithamalli and start chanting mantraprayogams" and gave Shastrigal his blessings.

Sri Subramanya Shastrigal on hearing this, shed tears and immediately asked his son K S Viswam Iyer, his sister's son T.K.Srinivasan and his son-in-law Athmanatha Iyer to take him to Sithamalli.   As soon as he reached Sithamalli, Sastrigal, sitting on porch of his house, started chanting Slokas on "Apathsanyasa Upadesa Panchaka". People on hearing this, gathered in hundreds for darshan of Shastrigal. After 45 days, the Shastrigal on knowing that his end was nearing, called his brother, Vembu Iyer, and asked to arrange for Sanyasa Yoga. As instructed, Vembu Iyer, Nagabhushanam Iyer, K S Viswam Iyer and others arranged everything. Being a great yogi, he knew the exact date and time of his Mukti.

Vedic scholars, friends and relatives and thousands of people, from all parts of Tamil Nadu, assembled there. There was continuous chanting Sri Rudram, Sri Chamakam and other shkolas. Sri Subramanya Sastrigal told the gathering that on Thursday, 9 November, the year 1933, he would leave this world. He asked people to celebrate the attaining of Jeevan Mukti and light Kuthu-vilakku, decorate their houses with Maavilai, Kolam etc., wear new clothes that day and everybody should be happy and celebrate the occasion. His body was buried on the western side of Sri Kulasekara Swami temple and ever since, the Adishtanam has been a place of public worship.

References

See also
Mannargudi Raju Sastri

Indian Hindu spiritual teachers
1868 births
1933 deaths
20th-century Hindu religious leaders